The 1954–55 season was the fifty-third season in which Dundee competed at a Scottish national level, playing in Division A, where the club would finish in 8th place under new manager Willie Thornton. Dundee would also compete in both the Scottish Cup and the Scottish League Cup. They would be knocked out of the group stages of the League Cup, and would be defeated by Rangers in a replay in the 5th round of the Scottish Cup.

Scottish Division A 

Statistics provided by Dee Archive.

League table

Scottish League Cup 

Statistics provided by Dee Archive.

Group 4

Group 4 table

Scottish Cup 

Statistics provided by Dee Archive.

Player Statistics 
Statistics provided by Dee Archive

|}

See also 

 List of Dundee F.C. seasons

References

External links 

 1954-55 Dundee season on Fitbastats

Dundee F.C. seasons
Dundee